We Will Overcome is the debut album by Texas melodic hardcore band Close Your Eyes. It was released on February 16, 2010.

Music videos were produced for the three singles: "Song for the Broken", "The Body", and "Digging Graves".

This album is the only studio album to feature former drummer David Fidler, before his departure from the band.

Track listing

Personnel

Close Your Eyes
Andrew Rodriguez - guitar
Brett Callaway - vocals, guitar
David Fidler - drums, percussion
Shane Raymond - lead vocals
Sonny Vega - bass, vocals

Production
Christopher L. R. Goodwin - production, engineering, additional guitars, additional vocals
MD Thompson - production and engineering

References

2010 debut albums
Close Your Eyes (band) albums
Victory Records albums